Tropical Storm Lester was a weak tropical storm that paralleled the Mexican coastline in October 2004. The sixteenth tropical cyclone and twelfth named storm of the 2004 Pacific hurricane season, Lester originated from an area of disturbed weather that persisted southwest of the Gulf of Tehuantepec. After organizing, the system was designated as a tropical depression on October 11. The depression was upgraded to a tropical storm the next day, and moved northwestward, just off the Mexican coastline. Due to the interaction with land among other factors, the storm degenerated on October 13. The storm dropped locally heavy rainfall, which caused minor flooding and mudslides. No fatalities or significant damage were reported.

Meteorological history

By October 10, 2004, an area of disturbed weather was situated well to the southwest of the Gulf of Tehuantepec. Later that day, a surface low pressure system developed, and convection began to organize into slightly curved bands. The disturbance continued to in this manner, and at 1800 UTC on October 11, the low level circulation had become sufficiently organized to be designated as a tropical depression. At the time, the depression consisted of a well-defined circulation, with some deep thunderstorm activity. Despite weak steering currents, the system started what was initially thought to be a westward drift, though just a few hours later was found to be towards the northwest. A small cyclone, a burst of deep convection formed at around the same time, and was said could have produced tropical storm-force winds.

Continuing its slow, northwestward track under the weal steering currents of a weak mid-level ridge to its north, and a broad cyclonic circulation to its southwest, it was upgraded to Tropical Storm Lester at 1800 UTC on October 12. Originally, it was unclear whether the center of circulation would remain slightly offshore, or move inland. Due to the presence of a weak upper-level anticyclone that was centered just east of the system, favorable atmospheric conditions for strengthening prevailed, and the storm reached its peak intensity with winds of  about 6–12 hours after being upgraded to a tropical storm. Early on October 13, radar imagery from Acapulco, Mexico indicated that Lester remained a small and well-organized cyclone as it passed just offshore. At the same time, light southwesterly wind shear began to develop. The interaction with land, combined with influence from the low to the southwest, started to weaken the storm, and it was downgraded to a tropical depression at 1200 UTC on October 13. By later that day, reports from an Air Force Reserve Unit Hurricane Hunter Aircraft indicated that the cyclone had degenerated into a trough on the northeastern side of the larger low to the southwest.

Preparations and impact
On October 12, in response to Lester, the Mexican government issued a tropical storm watch for the coast between Punta Maldonado to Zihuatanejo. It was upgraded to a warning later that day. It was extended to Lázaro Cárdenas on October 13. Later that day, the warning was lifted when Lester dissipated. Lester brought rains to parts of Oaxaca and Guerrero, reaching .

Although there were no reports of deaths, according to the National Hurricane Center, the storm capsized two ships, and washed two more ashore. The heavy rain caused mudslides, which buried one man in his home; he was later rescued by his family. In and around the port of Acapulco, minor flooding was reported and 42 trees toppled. Four landslides blocked four roads in Nayarit. A total of 13 families were evacuated in Rosamorada.

See also

List of Pacific hurricanes
Other East Pacific tropical storms
Other tropical cyclones named Lester
Timeline of the 2004 Pacific hurricane season

References

External links

Tropical Cyclone Report

Lester
Lester 2004
Lester 2004
Lester